"Sã qui turo zente pleta" is a Portuguese villancico for Christmas. It was composed by an anonymous monk of the Monastery of Santa Cruz circa 1643.

Performers of this song include the Roger Wagner Chorale, Chanticleer, Santa Fe Desert Chorale and The King's Singers.

References 

Christmas carols
Portuguese songs
Baroque compositions
17th-century songs